Pure is a dystopian novel written by Julianna Baggott and published in February 2012 by Grand Central Publishing in the US and by Headline in the UK. The first part of a trilogy, it tells the story of Pressia and her people, living in a post-apocalyptic world destroyed by nuclear bombs, and Partridge and his people who live inside The Dome, a giant bunker that spared people from the destruction. The people on the outside call the dome-dwellers "pures", untouched by radiation. The people inside the Dome call the outsiders "wretches", considering them less than human. The novel follows Pressia's and Partridge's stories separately, until they unexpectedly meet.

Baggott has written two sequels to Pure: 2013's Fuse and 2014's Burn.

20th Century Fox, with Karen Rosenfelt as producer, have acquired the film rights for the upcoming movie adaptation of this book.  James Ponsoldt is attached to direct.

References

External links
 Official site

American young adult novels
2012 American novels
Dystopian novels
Post-apocalyptic novels
Grand Central Publishing books
Headline Publishing Group books